Kenansville, Florida, United States, is an unincorporated community in Osceola County. It is approximately sixty-one miles southeast of the Greater Orlando urban region. The zip code is 34739.

History 
Kenansville was founded in the late 1800s when the Okeechobee spur of the Florida East Coast Railroad came to the area, bypassing nearby Whittier. The town was mostly centered around cattle and possibly providing services to travelers. The poorly drained, sandy Myakka, Smyrna and Immokalee soil series around town continue to be used as rangeland. The town's received a name in 1914 and Kenansville comes from Henry Flagler's third wife Mary Lily Kenan. A legend claims that Elvis Presley had stayed at the Heartbreak Hotel and his experience there inspired him to write his song "Heartbreak Hotel". The town declined in importance when the railroad spur was pulled out.

Solar facility 

On August 3, 2016, the Osceola Solar Facility opened halfway between Kenansville and St. Cloud. The facility takes up approximately 17 acres of land. It can provide approximately 3.6 megawatts at full power and provide power to 760 homes. It was created as part of Duke Energy's plan to switch over to more solar power and less coal power.

Demographics 

The population in Kenansville is 564 as of 2016. The population density is 2 people per square mile. The median age in Kenansville is 52.1 years old. The number of people per household in Kenansville is 2.1. 54.4% of residents are married, 16.0% are divorced, 3.9% are married with children, and 16.0% have children, but are single.

Climate

References

External links
Kenansville at Ghosttowns

Unincorporated communities in Osceola County, Florida
Greater Orlando
Unincorporated communities in Florida